is a Japanese shōnen manga created by Norihiro Yagi. It was serialized Monthly Shōnen Jump from 1992 to 2000, in total of 15 volumes. An adaptation of acts 1 and 2 from the first volume of the manga was produced by Toei Animation and released in an original video animation format on December 13, 1996.

Plot
Angel Densetsu is a story about Seiichirō Kitano, a kind and naive boy with the heart of an angel, but the sinister looks of a devil. This paired with his horrible luck and awkward social skills causes many misunderstandings, leading people to assume that he is a delinquent and heroin addict, and (unbeknownst to himself) results in a career as the head thug, or "school guardian" at his new school.

Characters

Hekikuu High School
 
 
 
 

Suda
Koide

Principal 
Shiraishi 
Murakami, the teacher in charge of Ryoko's class and the advisor for the karate club.
Kishida, a guidance counselor at Hekikuu High.
Iwata, a guidance counselor at Hekikuu High.

Hakuun High School
Takeshi Kojima 
Hayami, Hakuun High's number 2.
Tanabe, the guidance counselor of Hakuun High.

Hirin High School
Nakanishi, the boss of Hirin High.
Katayama
Shioda, Takehisa's senpai in middle school.

Delinquent re-educators
They are known as special guidance counselors, but they are actually working for the Education Committee. They are known as the "Shadowy Seven" (and "Shadowy Six" after Shirataki's retirement).
Irie, the first of the seven guidance counselors, seen in chapter 7.
Kumagai, the most warrior-like of the seven.
Shirataki, the third special guidance counselor dispatched from the Education Committee to deal with Kitano.
Haruka Hishida, first seen in chapter 43.
The other three members of the seven/six were never introduced during the series.

Kitano's Parents
, his father, an ordinary office worker, first seen in chapter 21.
, his mother, first seen in chapter 21.

Ryoko’s Parents
Heizo Koiso, Ryoko's father.
Mrs. Koiso, Ryoko's deceased mother.

The Halford Family
Papa Halford, an American with a Japanese wife and two children, who moved to Japan 20 years ago.
Mama Halford, introduced in chapter 66.
, the half-Japanese first son of the Halford family.
, Leo's little sister.

Others
Kiyomi Kaburagi, president of the Photography Club at a high school near Hekikuu High.
Kikuchi, a member of the Photography Club.
Yamazaki, a member of the Photography Club
Noguchi, a member of the Photography Club
Chuji Asai, Midori's cousin, only seen 18 years ago in chapters 76 to 78.

Volumes
1 (August 1, 1993)
2 (February 4, 1994)
3 (August 4, 1994)
4 (January 11, 1995)
5 (July 11, 1995)
6 (December 11, 1995)
7 (March 4, 1996)
8 (August 4, 1996)
9 (February 4, 1997)
10 (August 4, 1997)
11 (February 4, 1998)
12 (August 4, 1998)
13 (February 4, 1999)
14 (August 4, 1999)
15 (April 4, 2000)

Reception
On Anime News Network, Justin Sevakis calls the OVA "easily one of my top 10 anime comedies of all time."

References

External links
 

1992 manga
1996 anime OVAs
Comedy anime and manga
Shōnen manga
Shueisha franchises
Shueisha manga
Toei Animation original video animation
Yankī anime and manga